Carin Maria Nilsson (later Lommerin, 10 December 1904 – 20 December 1999) was a Swedish freestyle swimmer. Aged 15 she won a bronze medal in 4 × 100 m freestyle relay at the 1920 Summer Olympics in Antwerp along with Aina Berg, Emily Machnow and Jane Gylling.

References

1904 births
1999 deaths
Olympic swimmers of Sweden
Swimmers at the 1920 Summer Olympics
Olympic bronze medalists for Sweden
Swimmers from Stockholm
Olympic bronze medalists in swimming
Swedish female freestyle swimmers
Stockholms KK swimmers
Medalists at the 1920 Summer Olympics
Women's World Games medalists
20th-century Swedish women